Morgan is an unincorporated community in northwestern Winneshiek County, Iowa, United States.

History
A post office was established in February 1857, and remained in operation until being discontinued in December 1866.

References

Unincorporated communities in Winneshiek County, Iowa
Unincorporated communities in Iowa
1857 establishments in Iowa
Populated places established in 1857